Moszczenica  is a village in Piotrków County, Łódź Voivodeship, in central Poland. It is the seat of the gmina (administrative district) called Gmina Moszczenica.

The village has a population of 2571.

References

Villages in Piotrków County